Mario José Soto Soto (16 July 1933 – 28 September 1998) was a Chilean footballer. He played in ten matches for the Chile national football team in 1959 and 1960. He was also part of Chile's squad for the 1959 South American Championship that took place in Argentina.

References

External links
 

1933 births
1998 deaths
Chilean footballers
Chile international footballers
Place of birth missing
Association football forwards
Club Deportivo Universidad Católica footballers